The Third, now referred to as Henry The Third, is the third studio album by bachata singer Henry Santos. This album included two singles that peaked in the Billboard Tropical Airplay chart. Its lead single, "Y Eres Tan Bella", peaked at number 23. The second single, "Quédate", peaked at number 22. This is also his first album after no longer being signed to Siente Music & Universal Music Latino. He released it under his own record label, HustleHard Entertainment.

Track listing

References

2016 albums
Henry Santos albums
Spanish-language albums